The 2010 Judo Grand Slam Tokyo was held in Tokyo, Japan, from 11 to 13 December 2010.

Medal summary

Men's events

Women's events

Source Results

Medal table

References

External links
 

2010 IJF World Tour
2010 Judo Grand Slam
Judo
Grand Slam, 2010
Judo
Judo